Eadwulf of Bamburgh may refer to:

Eadwulf I of Northumbria (died AD 717), King of Northumbria
Eadwulf II of Northumbria (died AD 913), Earl of Northumbria (or possibly King)
Eadwulf Evil-child (fl. AD 963–973), Earl of Bamburgh
Eadwulf Cudel (died 1019), Earl of Bernicia (or Bamburgh)
Eadwulf III of Bamburgh (died 1041), Earl of Bernicia

See also
Eardwulf of Northumbria